Anusha Dandekar (born 9 January 1982) is an Indian-Australian MTV VJ, actress and singer, who is best known as a VJ and a host who has hosted several shows.

Early life
Dandekar was born in Sudan on 9 January 1982 into a Marathi family of Shashidhar and Sulabha Dandekar, originally from Pune, India. She and her sisters, actress and model Shibani Dandekar and Apeksha Dandekar grew up in Kingsgrove, New South Wales, a suburb of Sydney, Australia.

Career 

In 2002, at the age of 19, Dandekar moved to Mumbai, Maharashtra to pursue a career in the entertainment industry. She was cast as an anchor in MTV's House of Style. She later hosted MTV Dance Crew, MTV Teen Diva, MTV News and MTV Love School for the network.

In 2008, she won Best VJ at the Cosmopolitan Fun Fearless Female Awards. As of 2014, Dandekar is a judge on India's Next Top Model alongside model-actress Lisa Haydon.

In 2003, Dandekar made her acting debut in Bollywood with Mumbai Matinee and went on to do Viruddh in 2005, alongside Bollywood veterans Amitabh Bachchan, Sanjay Dutt, Sharmila Tagore and John Abraham. Her performance in the film won her the Best Debut Award at the Maharashtra Times Awards in 2006. She then went on to star in the musical Miss Bollywood. Later in 2006, she starred in Anthony Kaun Hai? alongside Arshad Warsi and Sanjay Dutt. In 2012, she made her Marathi film debut with her role in Jai Jai Maharashtra Majha.

In 2012, Dandekar made her music debut with single Better Than Your Ex. The song, in the English language, was released in June.

A fashion icon, Dandekar has also graced the covers of Cosmopolitan, Elle and Seventeen. She has also endorsed the brands Reebok, Toni & Guy, Crocs and Lee Jeans.

In 2017 she became a mentor on a show India's Next Top Model, which is aired on MTV India.

Discography

Filmography

Television

Special appearances

Awards and nominations 

!
|-
!scope="row"|2004
| Mumbai Matinee
| Stardust Award for Most Exciting New Face
| 
|  style="text-align:center;"|
|-
|2006
| Viruddh
| Stardust Award for Breakthrough Performance – Female
| 
|  style="text-align:center;"|
|-
|2006
| Viruddh
| Maharashtra Times Sanmaan Best Debut Award
| 
|  style="text-align:center;"|
|-
|2007
| Herself
| Filmfare Award for Best Face
| 
|  style="text-align:center;"|
|-
|2009
| Herself
| Cosmopolitan Fun Fearless Female Award for Best VJ
| 
|  style="text-align:center;"|
|-
|2010
| Herself
| Femina's List of 50 Most Beautiful Women in India Award
| 
|  style="text-align:center;"|
|}

References

External links 

 
 

Living people
1982 births
Actresses from Pune
People from Khartoum
Marathi people
Indian film actresses
Indian women singers
Indian emigrants to Australia
Actresses from Sydney
Australian film actresses
Australian women singers
Australian VJs (media personalities)
Australian game show hosts
Australian women television presenters
Australian people of Marathi descent
Australian people of Indian descent
Australian actresses of Indian descent
Australian expatriate actresses in India
Actresses in Hindi cinema
21st-century Australian actresses
21st-century Australian singers
21st-century Australian women singers